Nader Khalili (1936–2008) was an Iranian-born American architect, author, and educator. He is best known for his inventive structures that incorporated a range of atypical building materials to provide shelter in the developing world and emergency contexts. His work was heavily influenced by the traditional arid house designs of Iran.

Early life and education
Nader Khalili was born in Tehran, Pahlavi Iran into a large family, he had 8 siblings. He attended the University of Tehran where he studied Persian literature and poetry; followed by the study of engineering and architecture at Istanbul Technical University.

Career 

In 1970, he was licensed by the state of California and practiced architecture in the U.S. and around the world. In 1975, Khalili was working in Iran at a conventional western-style architecture firm on projects for the Shah Mohammad Reza Pahlavi, when he realized his profits were coming at the expense of traditional Iranian architecture. He sold his stake in the firm, bought a motorcycle, and spent the next five years living in remote parts of the Iran desert. His goal was to preserve the historical Iranian architecture and help house the poor.

His designs are heavily inspired by traditional arid house designs in his homeland Iran. He was involved with Earth Architecture and Third World Development since 1975, and was a U.N. consultant for Earth Architecture. Khalili was known for his innovation into the Geltaftan Earth-and-Fire System known as Ceramic Houses and the Earthbag Construction technique called Superadobe.

He developed his Super Adobe system in 1984, in response to a NASA call for designs for human settlements on the moon and Mars. The project had been completely theoretical until the Persian Gulf War in 1990–1991 when refugees were sent into Iran. When this occurred Khalili partnered with the United Nations Development Programme (UNDP) and the United Nations High Commissioner for Refugees (UNHCR) and applied his research to emergency shelters.

In 1991 he founded the California Institute of Earth Art and Architecture (Cal-Earth), where he taught his Superadobe building technique.  Although Khalili's work received mixed support in his native country, arguably due to social paradigms and political unrest, he became a prominent American leader on the value of ethically based architecture, where the needs of the homeless are considered above all else.

In February 2000, Khalili designed a prototype of a lunar colony made with all-natural materials near the Mojave Desert.

He died March 5, 2008, in Los Angeles of congestive heart failure. After his death, his children Dastan and Sheefteh have continued the legacy of his work.

Awards
In 1984, Khalili received the award for “Excellence in Technology” from the California Council of the American Institute of Architects (CCAIA) for his innovative Ceramic House System. In 1987 he received a Certificate of Special Recognition from the U.N. International Year of Shelter for the Homeless and U.S. Department of Housing and Urban Development (HUD) for his project "Housing for the Homeless: Research and Education." In 2004 Khalili won the Aga Khan Award for Architecture for sandbag shelters built with Superadobe.

Books by Khalili
Khalili wrote books on his architectural philosophy & techniques as well as translations of poetry from Rumi, the poet he considered instrumental in his design inspiration.
 
 
 
 
 Rumi, Fountain of Fire
 Rumi, Dancing the Flame

See also 

 Yasmeen Lari

References

External links
Khalili, Nader. "Nader Khalili." Cal-Earth. 19 Jan. 2007 http://www.calearth.org/khalili.htm
Sinclair, Cameron, and Kate Stohr. "Superadobe." Design Like You Give a Damn. Ed. Diana Murphy, Adrian Crabbs, and Cory Reynolds. Ney York: Distributed Art Publishers, Inc., 2006. 104-13. 
Kellogg, Stuart, and James Quigg. "Good Earth." Daily Press. 18 Dec. 2005. Freedom Communications, Inc. 22 Jan. 2007 https://web.archive.org/web/20070126064107/http://www.vvdailypress.com/2005/113489280061585.html
Alternative Construction: Contemporary Natural Building Methods. Ed. Lynne Elizabeth and Cassandra Adams. New York: John Wiley & Sons, Inc., 2000. 
Hunter, Kaki, and Donald Kiffmeyer. Earthbag Building. Gabriola Island, BC: New Society Publishers, 2004. 
Kennedy, Joseph F. "Building With Earthbags." Natural Building Colloquium. NetWorks Productions. 14 Feb. 2007 http://www.networkearth.org/naturalbuilding/earthbags.html
Wojciechowska, Paulina. "Building with Earth - A Gide to Flexible-Form Earthbag Construction." White River Junction, VT: Chelsea Green Publishing Company, 2001.
The Green Building Program. "Earth Construction." Sustainable Building Sourcebook. 2006. 14 Feb. 2007 https://web.archive.org/web/20071003055431/http://www.austinenergy.com/Energy%20Efficiency/Programs/Green%20Building/Sourcebook/earthConstruction.htm
NBRC. "NBRC Misc. Photos." NBRC: Other Superadobe Buildings. 10 Dec. 1997. 14 Feb. 2007 https://web.archive.org/web/20070130152535/http://users.pstel.net/goshawk/other.htm 
CCD. "CS05__Cal-Earth SuperAdobe." Combating Crisis with Design. 20 Sept. 2006. 14 Feb. 2007 http://combatingcrisiswithdesign.blogspot.com/2006/09/cs05cal-earth-superadobe.html
American Institute of Architects. A Conversation with Nader Khalili. 2004. 14 Feb. 2007 http://www.aia.org/nwsltr_print.cfm?pagename=aiaj_a_20051201_khalili

1936 births
2008 deaths
Iranian architects
20th-century American architects
Iranian emigrants to the United States
University of Tehran alumni
Istanbul Technical University alumni
New Classical architects